Andrè Muri (born 22 April 1981) is a former Norwegian football defender. He started his career in his local team Asker, before moving to Stabæk in the Norwegian Premier League for some year. But when Stabæk lost the final match in 2004 against Vålerenga, they were relegated for the 2005 season. Vålerenga bought Muri from Stabæk in February 2005. Later in the same year, they won the league championship. In the summer window of 2007, Muri went on loan to Odd Grenland, and returned to Vålerenga after finishing the season at Odd Grenland placed 4th in the league.

Career statistics

Honours
 Serie Sølv 2010 (League Silver)
 Cupmester 2008 (Cup Champion)
 Serie Bronse 2006 (League Bronze)
 Seriemester 2005 (League Champion)

External links

 
 
 

1981 births
Living people
People from Asker
Association football defenders
Norwegian footballers
Norway youth international footballers
Norway under-21 international footballers
Asker Fotball players
Stabæk Fotball players
Vålerenga Fotball players
Odds BK players
Eliteserien players
Sportspeople from Viken (county)